The Boone County Courthouse in Madison, West Virginia was completed in 1921 in the Neoclassical Revival style. Designed by architect H. Rus Warne of Charleston, the courthouse stands on a small hill in a square. Construction started in 1917, but disputes and construction delays extended construction for four years.  Its dome was gold-leafed in 1977.

It was listed on the National Register of Historic Places in 1981.

References

Neoclassical architecture in West Virginia
County courthouses in West Virginia
Courthouses on the National Register of Historic Places in West Virginia
Government buildings completed in 1917
H. Rus Warne buildings
National Register of Historic Places in Boone County, West Virginia
Renaissance Revival architecture in West Virginia